Midnight Flyer may refer to:

 "Midnight Flyer" (song), a 1959 song recorded by Nat King Cole 
 Midnight Flyer, a rock band fronted by Maggie Bell
 The Midnight Flyer,  a 1918 American short action film directed by George Marshall